Mihai Furtună (born 16 August 1955) is a Moldovan politician, deputy-mayor of Chişinău since September 2001. Mihai Furtună was acting Mayor of Chişinău for 10 days between 18–28 April 2005, after Serafim Urechean sacked.

Education 
 1994–1996 - The Academy of Public Administration of the Government of the Republic of Moldova, specialized in International Relations, the degree in international relations;
 1979–1985 - Polytechnic Institute "S. Lazo" of Chișinău, specialty Economics and organization of construction, qualification - economist engineer;
 1972–1979 - The College of Constructions of Chișinău, specialty Industrial and civil construction, qualification - technician-builder.

Professional experience  
 September 2001 - January 2012 - Deputy Mayor of Chișinău municipality
 August 1999 - September 2001 - Praetor of the Botanica District 
 October 1997 - August 1999 - Praetor of the Buiucani District
 1990–1991 - Deputy Director of the Education Plant through courses of the Ministry of Construction
 1980–1987 - Senior Master at the Education Plant through courses of the Ministry of Construction 
 1975–1980 - Master at the Education Plant through courses of the Ministry of Construction.

Publications 
 Traditional Administration Structures Establishing in Moldova, Public Administration, no. 4 (1998)
 The constitutionality and the evolution of the public authorities structures. The rule of law and the public administration (1999).

References

1955 births
Living people
Mayors of Chișinău
Recipients of the Order of Work Glory